James Warner Wallace (born June 16, 1961) is an American homicide detective and Christian apologist. Wallace is a Senior Fellow at the Colson Center for Christian Worldview and an Adjunct Professor of Apologetics at Talbot School of Theology (Biola University) in La Mirada, California. He has authored several books, including Person of Interest, Cold-Case Christianity, God's Crime Scene, and Forensic Faith, in which he applies principles of cold case homicide investigation to apologetic concerns such as the existence of God and the reliability of the Gospels. He has been featured as a cold case homicide expert on Fox 11 Los Angeles, truTV (formerly Court TV), and NBC.

Life and work
Wallace was born in Torrance, California. He graduated from the Los Angeles Sheriff's Explorer Academy in 1978 (earning the Honor Cadet award). From there he went on to pursue a career in the arts, earning a bachelor's degree in design from California State University at Long Beach and a master's degree in architecture from the University of California, Los Angeles (UCLA). In 1988, Wallace returned to law enforcement, attending the Los Angeles Sheriff's Academy as a recruit for the Torrance (CA) Police Department (graduating again as the Honor Cadet). During his law enforcement career, Wallace served on a number of assignments, including SWAT, Gang Detail, and Robbery Homicide. He was also one of the founding members of the Torrance Police Department's Cold-Case Homicide Unit.

Investigative work
As a homicide detective, Wallace has investigated a number of high-profile cold-case murders. His cases have been featured on Dateline (NBC) and North Mission Road (truTV). As a founding member of the Torrance Police Department Cold-Case Homicide Unit, Wallace earned the Sustained Superiority Award from the South Bay Police and Fire Medal of Valor committee. He also won the 2015 California Peace Officer Association COPSWEST Award for best solved cold case.

Conversion to Christianity
In 1996, Wallace became a Christian at the age of 35, after investigating the gospels as potential eyewitness accounts to the life of Jesus, using his detective expertise. Wallace attended and eventually joined the staff of Saddleback Church. He later enrolled in the Golden Gate Baptist Theological Seminary master's program in theological studies, while serving as a youth pastor at Rock Hills Church and later as a lead pastor for an organization called the Rising Tide.

Christian apologetics
Wallace began applying the principles of cold-case homicide investigation to Christian apologetics. He has written five books addressing the evidence for Christianity: Person of Interest, Cold-Case Christianity, Alive, God's Crime Scene, and Forensic Faith. Wallace has been a guest on a number of television programs, including The 700 Club (CBN), Praise The Lord (TBN), 100 Huntley Street (Crossroads), He has spoken on several radio broadcasts, including The Laura Ingraham Show, The Eric Metaxas Show, The Janet Mefferd Show, and In the Market with Janet Parshall.

Books

Cold-Case Christianity: A Homicide Detective Investigates the Claims of the Gospels 
Presents 10 principles of cold-case homicide cases and using them to investigate the claims of the New Testament gospels.

God's Crime Scene: A Cold-Case Detective Examines the Evidence for a Divinely Created Universe 
Wallace examines eight lines of evidence in what he calls the "crime scene of the universe," arguing they point to the existence of God.

Forensic Faith: A Homicide Detective Makes the Case for a More Reasonable, Evidential Christian Faith 
Wallace examines the evidentiary history of Christianity, teaching Christians to accept their duty, begin training, learn how to investigate and communicate the Christian worldview.

Alive: A Cold-Case Approach to the Resurrection 
Wallace investigates the accounts of the resurrection of Christ and argues that there is evidence to believe them.

Cold-Case Christianity for Kids: Investigate Jesus with a Real Detective 
Wallace explains about testing witnesses, examining the evidence, and investigating the case for Christianity.

God's Crime Scene for Kids: Investigate Creation with a Real Detective 
A mystery book in which readers explore evidence in Creation that points to God's existence.

Forensic Faith for Kids: Learn to Share the Truth from a Real Detective 
Investigative skills development for children.

So the Next Generation Will Know: Preparing Young Christians for a Challenging World 
Helping parents, youth leaders, and Christian teachers train the next generation with a Christian worldview.

Person of Interest: Why Jesus Still Matters in a World that Rejects the Bible 
Wallace describes his investigative journey from atheism to Christianity.

Television and Movies
Wallace has appeared in several television productions and news broadcasts. His cold cases have been featured on Dateline (NBC). he has also been featured on North Mission Road (TruTV, formerly CourtTV). He appeared several times as a homicide consultant on Behind the Screams (Reelz Network). Wallace has hosted a weekly television show, Cold-Case Christianity (NRBtv),and appeared in God's Not Dead 2 (PureFlix).

Dateline Appearances 
Deadly Triangle. This episode describes the murder of Archie McFarland.

The Night Before Halloween. This show features the murder of Robin Hoynes.

Secrets in the Mist. This episode describes the murder of Carol Lubahn.

The Wire. This two-hour show features the murder of Lynne Knight.

The Threat. This Dateline episode features a case from 1988. It describes the murder of Barbara “Joan” Bradford who was shot to death in her home.

The Murder of Teri Hollis. This Dateline web special features a case J. Warner Wallace's father originally investigated involving a young girl who was murdered in Torrance in 1972.

Personal life
Wallace is married to Susie who has been his co-author and editor. They have four children and live in Southern California.

References

External links
 Official website

Christian apologists
American Christian writers
1961 births
Living people
American Calvinist and Reformed ministers
California State University, Long Beach alumni
University of California, Los Angeles alumni
Golden Gate Baptist Theological Seminary alumni
Biola University faculty
People from Torrance, California
Converts to Protestantism from atheism or agnosticism
Critics of atheism
21st-century Christians